Hells Gate or Hell's Gate or Hell Gate may refer to:

Places

Africa
 Hell's Gate National Park, Kenya

Antarctica
 Hells Gate Moraine, Victoria Land

Asia
 Nyalam Town, Tibet
 A location in Nampong, Arunachal Pradesh, India
 The Darvaza gas crater, Turkmenistan

Australia
 A tourist stop on the Savannah Way in Queensland near the NT border
 A large cattle station near Maude, New South Wales
 The entrance to Macquarie Harbour on the western coast of Tasmania.

Caribbean
 Hell's Gate, Saba, a village on the Caribbean island of Saba
 Hell's Gate Island, in Antigua and Barbuda

Europe
 Walkington Wold, East Yorkshire, Britain

North America
Canada
 Hells Gate, British Columbia, a narrow gorge on the Fraser River
 Hell Gate canyon and Hell Gate Rapids on the Liard River in far northern British Columbia

United States
 Hells Gate, gap in Cochise County, Arizona
 Hells Gate, gap in Gila County, Arizona
 Hells Gate, gap in Santa Cruz County, Arizona
 Hells Gate, point of interest in Death Valley National Park, California
 Hells Gate, cliff in Eagle County, Colorado
 Hells Gate, channel in Collier County, Florida near Marco Island
 Hells Gate, channel in Camden County, Georgia
 Hells Gate State Park, just outside Lewiston, Idaho
 Hell's Gate, stretch of rapids on the Kettle River in Banning State Park, Minnesota
 Hell Gate, Montana, near the eastern end of the Missoula Valley, Montana
 Hells Gate, gap in Esmeralda County, Nevada
 Hell Gate, New York City, a narrow tidal channel in the East River in New York State
 Hell Gate Bridge
 Hells Canyon National Recreation Area, Oregon and Idaho, centered on the Snake River, a tributary of the Columbia River
 Hells Canyon, Snake River, Oregon
 Hells Gate, channel in Curry County, Oregon
 Hellgate Canyon, a gorge and rapids on the Rogue River in Josephine County, Oregon
 Hells Gate, channel in Palo Pinto County, Texas
 Hells Gate, a channel of the Columbia River at the mouth of Hells Gate Canyon, in Klickitat County, Washington

Oceania
 Hell's Gates (Tasmania), channel at the mouth of Macquarie Harbour, Western Tasmania
 Tikitere, area of geothermal activity in Rotorua, New Zealand
 Section of Davey River in the South West of Tasmania, known as Hells Gates

Books
 Hell Gate, a novel by Linda Fairstein#Publications
 Hell's Gate, a 2006 science fiction novel by David Weber and Linda Evans
 Hell Gate, a book by Douglas Hensley based on the hauntings of Bobby Mackey's Music World

Film
 Hell's Gate, a 1989 Italian horror film directed by Umberto Lenzi
 Hell's Gate, alternate title for the 1953 Japanese film Gate of Hell.

Sports
 Gogoplata, a type of wrestling chokehold also known as Hell's Gate

See also
 Gates of Hell (disambiguation)
 Hell Gate (disambiguation)
 Hellgate (disambiguation)